Liladhar Dake is a leader of Shiv Sena. He is a former cabinet minister in Government of Maharashtra . He was elected to the Maharashtra Legislative Assembly in 1990, 1995 and 1999 elections from Bhandup Assembly constituency. He held industries portfolio in the ministry headed by Manohar Joshi.

References

Shiv Sena politicians
Living people
Year of birth missing (living people)
Maharashtra MLAs 1995–1999
State cabinet ministers of Maharashtra
Politicians from Mumbai
Maharashtra MLAs 1999–2004
Marathi politicians